Kuhmareh District is a district (bakhsh) in Kuhchenar County, Fars province, Iran. At the 2006 census, its population was 18,635, in 4,191 families.  The district has one city: Nowdan.  The district has two rural districts (dehestan): Dasht-e Barm Rural District and Kuhmareh Rural District.

References 

Kazerun County
Districts of Fars Province